Robots is a science fiction anthology edited by American writers Jack Dann and Gardner Dozois. It was published in 2005, and includes stories on the theme of "robots" that were originally published from 1985 to 2003, though mostly from the last few years of that range.  It is the 32nd book in their anthology series for Ace Books.

Contents
James Patrick Kelly: "Itsy Bitsy Spider" (1997)
Mike Resnick: "Robots Don't Cry" (2003)
Howard Waldrop: "London, Paris, Banana" (2000)
Chris Beckett: "La Macchina" (1991)
Geoff Ryman: "Warmth" (1995)
Michael Swanwick: "Ancient Engines" (1998)
Alex Irvine: "Jimmy Guang's House of Gladmech" (2002)
Benjamin Rosenbaum: "Droplet" (2002)
Gene Wolfe: "Counting Cats in Zanzibar" (1996)
Steven Popkes: "The Birds of Isla Mujeres" (2003)
Howard Waldrop: "Heirs of the Perisphere" (1985)
Tony Daniel: "The Robot's Twilight Companion" (1996)

External links 

2005 anthologies
Jack Dann and Gardner Dozois Ace anthologies
Ace Books books
Robots in literature